East Mountain is a mountain located in Essex County, Vermont, in the "Northeast Kingdom".  East Mountain is flanked to the north by Seneca Mountain.

East Mountain stands within the watershed of the Connecticut River, which drains into Long Island Sound in Connecticut.
The north side of East Mountain drains into Madison Brook, thence into Paul Stream, and the Connecticut River.
The southeast side of East Mtn. drains into Stony Brook and Fitch Brook, thence into Granby Stream, and into Paul Stream.
The southwest side of East Mtn. drains into the East Branch of the Moose River, and thence into the Passumpsic River, another tributary of the Connecticut.

East Mountain is the site of the former USAF North Concord Air Force Station, a ground-based radar facility of the US military. Built in 1955, its name was changed to Lyndonville Air Force Station in 1962; it was closed in 1963.
The North Concord AFS reported an unidentified flying object (UFO) sighting in 1961 — a couple hours before the reported abduction of Barney and Betty Hill.  The US military sighting lasted 18 minutes.

Notes

See also 
 List of mountains in Vermont
 New England Fifty Finest

External links 
 
 

Mountains of Vermont
Landforms of Essex County, Vermont